Ágnes Gerlach (born 22 July 1968) is a Hungarian diver. She competed at the 1988 Summer Olympics and the 1992 Summer Olympics.

References

External links
 

1968 births
Living people
Hungarian female divers
Olympic divers of Hungary
Divers at the 1988 Summer Olympics
Divers at the 1992 Summer Olympics
Divers from Budapest
Sportspeople from Budapest